Lawrence "Lo" Leathers (November 23, 1981 – June 2, 2019) was an American jazz drummer who played on two of Cécile McLorin Salvant's albums that have won Grammy Awards for Best Jazz Vocal Album.

Biography
Leathers was born in Lansing, Michigan. He began to play professionally at the age of 15 and moved to New York after accepting a place at the Juilliard School. He is featured on two of Cécile McLorin Salvant's recordings, “For One to Love” (2015) and Dreams and Daggers (2017), both of which won Grammy Awards for Best Jazz Vocal Album.

Leathers is best known to a global jazz audience for his affiliations with pianist Aaron Diehl. Diehl’s trio includes Paul Sikivie on bass and Leathers on drums. The trio is often fronted with Jazz vocals by Cécile McLorin Salvant.

Featured by Capsulocity in 2012, he talks about what influences his music before he became a drummer for jazz musicians such as Mulgrew Miller, Wynton Marsalis, Wycliffe Gordon, Cyrus Chestnut and Rodney Whitaker.

Death
Leathers was killed during a domestic dispute with his girlfriend Lisa Harris on June 3, 2019 at his home in New York. Harris and Sterling Aguilar were arrested in connection with his death, with allegations that Harris restrained Leathers and Aguilar punched and choked him.

References 

1981 births
2019 deaths
Musicians from Lansing, Michigan
American jazz drummers